In the card game contract bridge, a takeout double is a low-level conventional call of "Double" over an opponent's bid as a request for partner to bid his best of the unbid suits. The most common takeout double is after an opponent's opening bid of one of a suit where the double shows a hand with opening values, support for all three unbid suits (at least three cards in each) and shortness in the suit doubled (preferably, no more than two).

Requirements
Commonly a double is considered for takeout whenever one of the following conditions is met (but see balancing double below):
Opponents have previously bid only one suit, and the player did not have chance to double that suit before.
Opponents have previously bid two suits, and partner has passed.
Opponents have found a fit.

Most common requirements to make a takeout double are:
Shortness in the opponents' suit(s) - preferably two or less, three at most
Length in each unbid suit - preferably four cards, at minimum three
 Some partnerships play that the double of a major promises four or more cards in the other major
High card point (HCP) strength of at least a minimal opening bid - 11 or more HCP
 More high-card strength is required when opponents have bid on higher levels (e.g. preempted).

The most common treatment is that the fewer high card points the hand possesses, the more strict are the distribution requirements (i.e. opponent's suit(s) shorter and unbid suits longer). With stronger hands a common treatment is to double first, regardless of distribution, and then make your bid even when it differs from partner's bid:
 16+ HCP and a good six-card suit can convert partner's bid to this suit
 18+ HCP and a good five-card suit can convert partner's bid to this suit
 19+ HCP balanced with a stopper in opener's suit can convert partner's bid to notrump
 Exception: 15-18 HCP balanced hands with a stopper in opener's suit usually make a 1NT overcall instead of a takeout double
Partnership agreement is required on the level to which Takeout doubles apply.  A typical treatment is that a double up to the level of 4 is takeout, while doubles on higher levels are for penalties or "cooperative" (i.e. the partner is supposed to pass unless his distribution and/or strength indicates that playing a contract of their own on a higher level is a better prospect).  However an alternative is to play takeout doubles even higher for several reasons:
 It is rare to hold a "true" penalty double (length and strength in opponent's suit)
 With highly distributional hands it is possible for both sides to have a making game
 Usually the preemptive bid is designed to be sacrifice (in the expectation that the penalty score will be less than the score for the making game or slam)

Sometimes a “shape” double can be made on less than 12 HCP and can be made with 9+ HCP but requires 4 cards in all unbid suits (if only 1 suit bid by opponents) or 5–4 in unbid suits (if 2 suits already bid by opponents)

Examples

Responses

Opponents pass
If the RHO passes, the advancer (the doubler's partner) is forced to bid and should make a descriptive bid indicating suit length, high-card strength and any stoppers:
 Showing the shape:
 With a longest suit bid this
 With 2 suits of equal length but different rank (1 major and 1 minor) favour the major suit (as this will typically score better whether in a part-score, game or slam)
 With 2 suits of equal length and rank bid the stronger suit
 With 3 suits of 4 cards bid the (better) major 
 With a balanced hand and at least 1 stopper in the opponent's suit bid notrump 
 With an opening strength hand and no clear strain, a cue bid of opponents' suit is often used to set up a game forcing auction and asking doubler to describe their hand
 When advancer's best suit is the opponent's suit, the takeout double can be passed for penalties and this is described in more detail below
 Showing the strength when bidding a suit:
 0-8 HCP - bid at the lowest available level in a suit (an expression sometimes used is "no more than an Ace and a King)
 9-11 HCP make a jump-bid
 12+ HCP jump to game, or if the strain is unclear, a cue bid of opponents' suit is often used to set up a game forcing auction and asking doubler to describe their hand
 Showing the strength when bidding notrump:
 8-10 HCP bid 1NT
 11-12HCP bid 2NT
 13+ HCP bid 3NT

The strength requirements above are lowered when the partner is known to be stronger (e.g. an opponents' preempt is doubled), and raised when partner can be weak (as in protective position).

One conventional variation (Bungay Black Dog Double) is that 1NT shows 6+ points and the cheapest bid in a suit is a natural "weak squeak" denying 6 points.

Opponents bid
If the RHO bids advancer is not forced to make a bid so, if one is made, it is a free bid and different strength ranges are used although the guidance on showing the shape remains the same except for the availability of the double as a new bid:
 Showing the strength when bidding a suit:
 0-5 HCP pass
 6-8 HCP bid at the lowest available level (can compete at the 2 level)
 9-11 HCP jump bid or compete at the 3 level
 12+ HCP bid the game or cue bid the opponents' suit
 Showing the strength when bidding notrump:
 8-10 HCP bid 1NT
 11-12HCP bid 2NT
 13+ HCP bid 3NT

A special case for 1NT
Typically doubles of notrump bids are for penalty, the exception is when opponents make a "dustbin" notrump bid:

In this case, responder is not showing a balanced hand but denying both support for opener and the values to make a two-level bid so a double is for takeout in this situation. However attention must be paid to the likely meaning of the 1NT bid.  In this case, responder is likely to have long clubs so it will be safe for North–South to play in hearts or spades.

Spades would be considered a safe suit but East might have length in clubs or diamonds. 

 There are no safe suits, East might have length and strength in any suit below spades.  In addition, opener might have a second suit but have decided against bidding at the two-level given responder's weakness.  In addition, since East-West may not have a fit it is possible that North-South do not have a fit and my end up at the two-level doubled so will need to exercise caution when vulnerable.

Later-round takeout doubles
Double can be for takeout even in later rounds of bidding. As before, it denotes support for unbid suits and, often, extra values. In general, any low-level double after opponents have bid a suit (especially if they have found a fit) and partner has passed is generally played for takeout:
 the opener himself can double for takeout in the second round of bidding, after the opponents have entered the auction and partner had (usually) passed
 also, an overcaller can second-round double as well, to show extra values and support for unbid suits.
 a first-round takeout doubler can make a takeout double again, with a strong hand (around 16+ points)

Balancing (protective) doubles
Balancing (commonly called protective in England) doubles occur when the doubler had to choose between passing and ending the auction or bidding again to reopen the auction.  Distribution and strength requirements for a takeout double are lowered in this situation.  A common expression is "borrow a King" meaning that the balancing doubler can add 3 points to their hand and then bid according to strength guidance.  So in this case a balancing double can be made with as little as 8HCP. and in some situations as little as 6HCP.

South, holding  can now double, expecting to find partner with strength and likely length in hearts, allowing him to pass for penalties or make a bid and this is a case for bidding with a little as 6HCP with the right holding, shortness in hearts is particularly important and 4+ in all other suits would be ideal.

 Although the bidding is a level higher East-West have found a comfortable fit and will probably be happy to play there.  This suggests that North–South also have a fit and should be very keen to enter the auction.  Competing at the three level might be risky as the major auction says very little about the minor suit holdings of East-West.  South should double with 10+HCP and shortness in hearts.

 As above South should be keen to compete (assuming East - West play traditional methods rather than inverted minors) but the auction has suggested that east–west don't hold length in any other suits (and the majors in particular).

South, holding  was not strong enough to double in the first round. However, he can expect the partner to have shortness in hearts and likely 4 cards in spades or diamonds, and thus make a balancing takeout double. Such doubles are more frequent on matchpoint scoring, where even a penalty of −100 for the failure to make 2 can be profitable against −110 or −140 that the opponents could score in 2.

Reopening doubles once showed extra values as well. With adoption of the negative double, however (a takeout double by responder), responder must pass with length and strength in the opposing suit. In order to protect against such situations, opener is obliged to double even with thin values, whenever his distribution is suitable. Some pairs even require opener to act somehow; responder's pass is forcing.

Equal level conversion doubles
This convention (also referred to as ELCD) can change the meaning of doubler bidding a new suit in some situations, for example:

This does not promise the extra values in diamonds but shows a hand with 5 diamonds and 4 spades and the values for a normal takeout double.  In this case doubler would need to jump in diamonds to show the stronger hand.  Some partnerships only play the convention in a sequence like this converting clubs to diamonds.
The name is derived from the fact that doubler is converting partner's bid at the same level.

This sequence does show a strong diamond hand as doubler has converted at a higher level.

Some partnerships also play this convention when holding 5–4 in the majors but with a hand that is neither weak nor strong and, therefore, they cannot use a 2 suited bid (e.g. Michael's cue bid).

See also
Negative double
Negative free bid
Support double

References

Contract bridge bidding
Bridge conventions